The State Political Directorate (also translated as the State Political Administration) (GPU) was the intelligence service and secret police of the Russian Soviet Federative Socialist Republic (RSFSR) from February 6, 1922, to December 29, 1922, and the Soviet Union from December 29, 1922, until November 15, 1923.

Name 
The official designation in line to the native reference is:
Русский: = Государственное политическое управление (ГПУ) при Народном комиссариaте внутренних дел (НКВД) РСФСР
tr =Gosudarstvennoe politicheskoe upravlenie (GPU) pri narodnom komissariate vnutrennikh del (NKVD) RSFSR – (GPU pri NKVD RSFSR)
English: = State Political Directorate (also State Political Administration) under the People's Commissariat of interior affairs of the Russian Soviet Federative Socialist Republic (RFSR)

Establishment
Formed from the Cheka, the original Russian state security organization, on February 6, 1922, it was initially known under the Russian abbreviation GPU—short for "State Political Directorate under the NKVD of the RSFSR" (Russian: Государственное политическое управление при НКВД РСФСР, Gosudarstvennoye politicheskoye upravlenie under the NKVD of the RSFSR"). Its first chief was the Cheka's former chairman, Felix Dzerzhinsky.

Mission

Internal security
On paper, the new agency was supposed to act with more restraint than the Cheka. For example, unlike the Cheka, it did not have the right to shoot suspected "counter-revolutionaries" at will. All those suspected of political crimes had to be brought before a judge in normal circumstances.

Foreign intelligence
The 'Foreign Department' of the GPU was headed by a former Bolshevik and party member, Mikhail Trilisser. The Foreign Department was placed in charge of intelligence activities overseas, including espionage and liquidation of 'enemies of the people'. Trilisser himself was later liquidated by Joseph Stalin during the Great Purge in 1940.

Disestablishment
With the creation of the USSR in December 1922, a unified organization was required to exercise control over state security throughout the new union. Thus, on November 15, 1923, the GPU left the Russian NKVD and was transferred into the all-union Joint State Political Directorate, also translated as "All-Union State Political Administration". Its official name was "Joint State Political Directorate under the Council of People's Commissars of the USSR" (Russian: Obyedinyonnoye gosudarstvennoye politicheskoye upravleniye under the SNK of the USSR, Объединённое государственное политическое управление при СНК СССР), or OGPU (ОГПУ).

Personnel

See also
  
 Commanders of the border troops USSR and RF
 Chronology of Soviet secret police agencies
 Eastern Bloc politics

References

Further reading

 Gerson, L. D. (1985). The Secret Police in Lenin"s Russia. Philadelphia, PA: Temple University Press.
 Nation, R. C. (2018). Black Earth, Red Star: A History of Soviet Security Policy, 1917-1991. Ithaca, NY: Cornell University Press.
 Ryan, James. (2012). Lenin's Terror: The Ideological Origins of Early Soviet State Violence. London: Routledge.

External links
 History of the MVD of Russia: 1917–1931 

 
Law enforcement agencies of the Soviet Union
Soviet intelligence agencies
Defunct law enforcement agencies of Russia
Defunct intelligence agencies
Law enforcement in communist states
Political repression in the Soviet Union
Russian intelligence agencies
Secret police
1922 establishments in Russia
1923 disestablishments in Russia
1923 disestablishments in the Soviet Union
Government agencies established in 1922
Government agencies disestablished in 1923